St Bride's Church (alternatively, Saint Brigid of Kildare Church) is an Episcopal parish church in North Ballachulish in the Scottish Highlands, within the Diocese of Argyll and The Isles.

The listed structure was built in 1874 to a design by the Edinburgh architect J. Garden Brown. The church is one of only two buildings, both churches, known to have been designed by Brown, who died at the age of 27. The following year, Onich was separated from Ballachulish and made into an individual charge.

Adjacent to the church is  St. Bride's Parsonage, designed by Ross & Macbeth in 1891.

The church is noted for its interior inspired by the Arts & Crafts movement with attractive floor tiling and stained glass windows. There is an impressive stone cross in the churchyard commemorating Alexander Chinnery-Haldane, Bishop of Argyll and the Isles.

References

External links

 Official website
 Diocesan profile

Churches in Highland (council area)
1874 establishments in Scotland
Religious organizations established in 1875
Churches completed in 1874
Episcopal church buildings in Scotland